Crescentwood is a former electoral division in the Canadian province of Manitoba.  It was created in 1969, abolished in 1979, re-established in 1989, and abolished again in 1999.

The Crescentwood riding was located in Winnipeg's south-central region.  After its abolition, most of the riding's territory was redistributed to Lord Roberts and Fort Garry.

List of provincial representatives

Election results

1969 general election

1973 general election

1975 by-election

1977 general election

1990 general election

1992 by-election

1995 general election

References

Former provincial electoral districts of Manitoba